UNIT: The Longest Night is a Big Finish Productions audio drama based on the long-running British science fiction television series Doctor Who. It continues the story of UNIT (United Nations Intelligence Taskforce). "The Longest Night" is the third in a four-part mini-series.

Plot 
The UNIT team are enjoying a night out in London when, suddenly, suicide bombers strike.

Cast
Colonel Emily Chaudhry - Siri O'Neal
Colonel Robert Dalton - Nicholas Deal
Scott Christie - Scott Andrews
Andrea Winnington - Sara Carver
Lieutenant Hoffman- Robert Curbishley
Nisha Townsend - Georgina Field
Francis Currie - Michael Hobbs
PM's Aide - Harry Myers
Prime Minister - Steffan Rhodri
Deputy Prime Minister Meena Cartwright - Vineeta Rishi
Major Philip Kirby - Johnson Willis

External links
Big Finish Productions - UNIT: The Longest Night

Longest Night
2005 audio plays